Modernismo is a literary movement that took place primarily during the end of the nineteenth and early twentieth-century in the Spanish-speaking world, best exemplified by Rubén Darío who is also known as the father of Modernismo. The term Modernismo specifically refers to the literary movement that took place primarily in poetry. This literary movement began in 1888 after the publication of Rubén Darío's Azul... . It gave Modernismo a new meaning. The movement died around 1920, four years after the death of Rubén Darío.  In Aspects of Spanish-American Literature, the author writes (1963),

“We must make art the basic element in our culture; the appreciation of beauty is a promise that we will arrive at the understanding of justice...” (pg. 35).

Modernismo influences the meaning behind words and the impact of poetry on culture. Modernismo, in its simplest form, is finding the beauty and advances within the language and rhythm of literary works.

Other notable exponents are Leopoldo Lugones, Manuel Gutiérrez Nájera, José Asunción Silva, Julio Herrera y Reissig, Julián del Casal, Manuel González Prada, Aurora Cáceres, Delmira Agustini, Manuel Díaz Rodríguez and José Martí. It is a recapitulation and blending of three European currents: Romanticism, Symbolism and especially Parnassianism. Inner passions, visions, harmonies and rhythms are expressed in a rich, highly stylized verbal music. This movement was of great influence in the whole Hispanic world (including the Philippines), finding a temporary vogue also among the Generation of '98 in Spain, which posited various reactions to its perceived aestheticism.

Characteristics of Modernismo

Modernismo is a distinct literary movement that can be identified through its characteristics. The main characteristics of Modernismo are:

 Giving an idea of the culture and time that we live within, cultural maturity. 
 Pride in nationality (pride in Latin American identity) 
 Search for a deeper understanding of beauty and art within the rhetoric. Gives ideas of meaning through colors and images related to senses. 
 Contains different metrics and rhythms. Uses medieval verses such as the Alexandrine verses from the French.  
 The use of Latin and Greek mythology.  
 The loss of everyday reality to which many of the modernismo poems are located within exotic or distant places. 
 The cultivation of a perfection within poetry.

Notable authors

Rubén Darío
Rubén Darío was the father of Modernismo as he trailblazed the path for future poets. Darío’s idea of modernistic poems was rejected by poets following World War I because many considered it outdated and too heavy in rhetoric. He developed the idea of modernism after following Spanish poets and being influenced by them heavily. Darío created a rhythm within his poetry to represent the idea of modernism. This changed the metric of Spanish literature. His use of the french method, Alexandrine verses, changed and enhanced the literary movement. Modernismo literary works also tend to include a type of vocabulary that many can see as lyrical. Modernistic vocabulary wielded many semantic fields to impart a different meaning behind different words within his literary work. Examples of this vocabulary that convey different meanings within his literary work would be items such as flowers, technology, jewelry, diamonds, luxury items, etc. This vocabulary often stemmed from, if not from the language itself, Greek and Latin terms.  Darío often mentions the 'swan' in his literary works to observe the idea of beauty and perfection within his writing. This is a major characteristic of Modernismo as it provides the idea of beauty and perfection within the idea of the poetry. In his poem El Cisne, he wrote: 

His contributions to the movement of Modernismo created an opportunity for poets to use their words with meaning behind them within their poems. The swan represents perfection and, according to Darío in his poem, the swan had the power to revive someone from the dead and there was no flaw in the swan. This represents the Modernismo movement within literary works.

José Martí
José Julián Martí y Pérez was born on January 28, 1853, in Havana, Cuba- died May 19, 1895. He was a poet, essayist, and a martyr for Cuban independence from Spain. His dedication to see a free Cuba made him a symbol of Cuba’s struggle for independence from Spain. He organized and unified the movement for Cuban independence and died on the battlefield fighting for it. Martí also used his writing ability to fight for independence. By the age of 15 he had published several of his poems and by the age of 16 he founded a newspaper La Patria Libre. This was during a revolutionary uprising that broke out in 1868 because he sympathized with the patriots. He was sentenced to six months of hard labor. Martí would continue to use his talent to call attention to the problems plaguing Latin America. He is considered one of the fathers of Modernismo.

Enrique González Martínez    
Enrique González Martínez was born April 13, 1871, in Guadalajara, Jalisco, Mexico. He died on February 19, 1952, in Mexico City, Mexico. Martínez is considered one of the last great Modernismo poets. While others consider him to be the first post-modernismo poet, he never completely abandoned his Modernismo characteristics in his work. For the first time in Latin American literature, there was more of a local concern in literature through his works. He was a medical doctor, professor and diplomat to Chile (1920-1922), Argentina (1922-24), Spain, and Portugal (1924-1931). One of his poems called Tuércele el cuello al cisne (Twist the Swan’s Neck) has often been seen as his anti-modernismo manifesto. However, this is far from the truth. Enrique González Martínez continued to be a modernismo poet for the rest of his life. Tuércele el cuello al cisne is not a rejection of the Modernismo movement but should be seen as a rejection of surface rhetorical devices and frivolity rather than of the whole movement.

References 

Aching, Gerard. The Politics of Spanish American Modernismo: Discourses of Engagement. Cambridge University Press, 1997.
Davison, Ned J. The Concept of Modernism in Hispanic Criticism. Boulder: Pruett Press, 1966.
Glickman, Robert Jay. Fin del siglo: retrato de Hispanoamérica en la época modernista. Toronto: Canadian Academy of the Arts, 1999.
Mañach, Jorge. Martí: Apostle of Freedom. Translated from Spanish by Coley Taylor, with a preface by Gabriela Mistral. New York, Devin-Adair, 1950.
Schulmanm, Iván A. and Manuel Pedro Gonzalez. Martí, Darío y el modernismo, Madrid, Editorial Gredos 1969. (Martí, Darío and Modernism
Torres-Rioseco, Arturo. Aspects of Spanish-American Literature. University of Washington Press, 1963.
El Modernismo en Cataluña
Works of Rubén Darío
Notes on Latin American Modernismo
El cisne

 
Latin American literature
Spanish words and phrases
Literary modernism